A Lego theme is a product line of Lego construction toys produced by The Lego Group based on a central concept.

Before 1978, Lego produced several construction sets with common themes, but they were not necessarily branded as part of a single series or theme. Following the introduction of minifigures in 1978, owner Kjeld Kirk Kristiansen pushed a new strategy of creating and marketing a series of sets he termed a "system within the system" and the three original environments (based on the present, past and future, respectively) were launched: Town, Castle, and Space. In 1987, Lego created themes within these environments, as well as introducing branding that identified a set as part of a theme. The company also produced product lines that used pieces outside of the standard Lego System such as Technic and Fabuland. Since then, many new themes have been introduced and discontinued, including the inclusion of licensed themes in 1999 such as Star Wars. Not all sets produced are necessarily part of any official theme including store exclusive sets, one-off licensed sets, and most advanced construction sets released prior to the introduction of Creator Expert.

Current themes

Discontinued themes and environments

Town, Space, Castle, Pirates, Aquazone, and Time Cruisers are more accurately called Systems or Environments than themes. The relationship between themes and factions is complicated.

References

External links
 
 Theme Inventory on Peeron
 Theme Inventory on LUGNET

Lists of toys